Wheate is a surname. Notable people with the surname include:

Nial J. Wheate (born 1976), Australian chemist
Sir Thomas Wheate, 1st Baronet (1667–1721), English politician
Sir Thomas Wheate, 2nd Baronet (1693–1746), English politician

See also
Wheat (surname)